Lincoln Township is a township in Winnebago County, Iowa, in the USA.

History
Lincoln Township was founded about 1889.

References

Townships in Winnebago County, Iowa
Townships in Iowa
1889 establishments in Iowa